S.Alam Group is a Bangladeshi industrial conglomerate. S. Alam Group also has investment in banking, leasing, insurance, stock brokering, and merchant banking. The industries under this group include food and allied products, steel, banking, consumer products, sugar, cement, power, energy, transportation, shipping, manufacturing, hospitality, financial institution, agro, trading, oil, and gas.

History 
In April 2009, S. Alam purchased Oman Bangladesh Leasing and Finance Limited. Md Saiful Alam Masud, chairman of S. Alam Group and First Security Islami Bank Limited, was appointed chairman of Oman Bangladesh Leasing and Finance Limited.

S. Alam Group signed an agreement with SEPCO3 to construct a powerplant in Chittagong in 2013. The Banshkhali power plant movement was launched to stop the construction of the Powe plant. Environmentalists have opposed the construction of the plant on environmental grounds.

On 5 January 2015, Ekushey Television abruptly halted transmissions without any notice in most areas around Bangladesh after airing a speech by the senior vice chairman of the Bangladesh Nationalist Party, Tarique Rahman. A sedition case was also filed as Rahman's speech was said to be "false, fabricated and instigating". The chairman of Ekushey, Abdus Salam, was subsequently arrested in a case filed under the Pornography Act of 2012, as the network allegedly aired a false report on a girl in one of their programs, Ekusher Chokh. Later, the channel resumed broadcasting in some areas, and resumed nationwide broadcasts over time. On 25 November 2015, a media release issued by Ekushey Television stated that S. Alam Group of Industries had acquired Ekushey, in an auction on 8 October.

S. Alam Group bought 50 per cent of the shares of Social Islami Bank Limited through 19 subsidiaries violating the Banking Company Act, 1991 in the process in 2017 achieving a hostile takeover. The same year the company took over Islami Bank Bangladesh Ltd and appointed Arastoo Khan chairman. The takeover of Islami Bank started in 2013 and was supported by the Awami League government as it was linked with the Bangladesh Jamaat-e-Islami. According to New Age, S. Alam Group had taken 300 billion taka loans from Islami Bank Bangladesh Ltd which was denied by the bank. The Minister of Finance, Abul Maal Abdul Muhith, announced an investigation of loans of the group. He believed the group was using loans from other banks for the takeover. According to Ahsan H Mansur, director of Policy Research Institute of Bangladesh, the group has taken 800 billion taka loans from various banks through its subsidiaries. The group has made significant investments in Singapore. It purchased 20 ships from Western Marine Shipyard for 2.5 billion taka.

In October 2018, S. Alam group purchased 45 per cent of the shares of Padma Islami Life Insurance Company.

On April 17, 2021, five workers at Banshkhali power plant were killed by police firing bullets at protesting workers demanding payment of dues and breaks for prayer and iftar during Ramadan. Their ages ranged from 18 to 25. More than 20 other workers were also injured. The company filed a case against a local engineer under the Digital Security Act. Bangladesh High Court ordered S. Alam Group to pay 500 thousand taka to each of those workers killed in the police action. The company launched a satellite television channel, Nexus Television, in July 2021.

Directorate of Consumers' Rights Protection had found S. Alam stopped production of edible oil during shortages hiking up price of oil in the market. In December 2022, Prime Minister Sheikh Hasina called for an investigation into S. Alam Group according to The Daily Star. The Prime Minister's Office denied the prime minister issued the order. Justices Md Nazrul Islam Talukder and Khizir Hayat of the High Court Division ordered an investigation into the S. Alam Group owned banks of Social Islami Bank Limited, First Security Islami Bank, and Islami Bank Bangladesh Ltd. Bangladesh Bank provided additional funding to five S. Alam Group owned banks, First Security Islami Bank, Global Islami Bank, Islami Bank Bangladesh, Social Islami Bank, and Union Bank. In 2022, it was one of five Bangladeshi groups that imported more than one billion dollar worth of raw materials; the others were Abul Khair Group, Bashundhara Group, BSRM, and Meghna Group of Industries.

In January 2023, S. Alam Group owned Islami Bank Bangladesh Ltd received 80 billion taka in emergency funds from Bangladesh Bank.

Companies of S.Alam Group

Food and allied products 

 S. Alam Soya Seed Extraction Plant Ltd.
 S. Alam Vegetable Oil Limited.
 S. Alam Super Edible Oil Limited.
 S. Alam Refined Sugar Industries Ltd.
 S. Alam Refined Sugar Industries Ltd. (Unit-2)
 S. Alam Tank Terminal Ltd.

Cement 

 S. Alam Cement Ltd.
 Portland Cements Ltd.

Steel 

 S. Alam Steels Ltd.
 S. Alam Cold Rolled Steels Ltd.
 S. Alam Cold Rolled Steels Ltd. (Unit-2)
 Galco Steels (BD) Ltd.
 Galco Steels (BD) Ltd. (Unit-2)

Power and energy 

 Karnaphuli Prakritik Gas Co. Ltd.
 Shah Amanat Prakritik Gas Co. Ltd.
 S. Alam Power Plant Ltd.
 S. Alam Power Plant ltd. (Unit-2)
 S. Alam Power Generation Ltd.
 SS Power 1 Ltd, Gondamara, Baskhali (660 MW Coal Power Plant).
 SS Power 2 Ltd, Gondamara, Baskhali (660 MW Coal Power Plant).

Transportation 
S. Alam Luxury Chair Coach Services Ltd.

Shipping 

 Bering Sea Lines

Manufacturing 

 S. Alam Bag Manufacturing Mills Ltd.

Properties 

 S. Alam Properties Ltd.
 Hasan Abason (Pvt.) Ltd.
 Modern Properties Ltd.
 Ocean Resorts Ltd.
 Prasad Paradise Ltd.
 Marine Empire
 Fatehabad Farm Ltd.

Trading 

 S. Alam Brothers Ltd.
 S. Alam Trading Co. (Pvt.) Ltd.
 S. Alam & Company
 Sonali Cargo Logistics (Pvt.) Ltd.
 Sonali Traders
 Global Trading Cor. Ltd.

Banks and non bank financial institution of S. Alam 
Islami Bank Bangladesh Limited
First Security Islami Bank
Al-Arafah Islami Bank Limited
Bangladesh Commerce Bank Limited
Union Bank Limited
Global Islami Bank (formerly NRB global bank limited)
Social Islami Bank Limited
Aviva Finance (previously Reliance Finance)
Reliance Brokerage Services Limited

See also
 List of companies of Bangladesh

References

External links
 

Conglomerate companies of Bangladesh
Companies based in Chittagong
1985 establishments in Bangladesh